Neumarkt in der Steiermark is a municipality in the district of Murau in Styria, Austria.

International relations

Twin towns – Sister cities
Neumarkt is twinned with:

 Monfalcone, Italy

References

Seetal Alps
Cities and towns in Murau District